Hampton is a small village and former civil parish in the unitary authority of Cheshire West and Chester and the ceremonial county of  Cheshire, England. According to the 2001 UK census, the total population of the civil parish was 409, decreasing marginally to 405 at the 2011 Census. The parish included Hampton Green. The civil parish was abolished in 2015 to form No Man's Heath and District, part of it also went to Malpas.

The Whitchurch and Tattenhall Railway used to pass through Hampton and was the site of the Malpas railway station.

See also
 
 Listed buildings in Hampton, Cheshire
 Hampton Old Hall

References

External links 
 

Former civil parishes in Cheshire
Cheshire West and Chester
Malpas, Cheshire